David Read is the name of:

 David Charles Read (1790–1851), English painter and etcher
 David Breakenridge Read (1823–1904), Canadian lawyer, educator, author and mayor of Toronto
 David William Lister Read (1922–2015), author
 David Read (footballer) (born 1941), footballer for Chester City
 David Read (botanist), British professor of plant science
 David H. C. Read (1910–2001), Scottish Presbyterian clergyman and author

See also 
 David Reed (disambiguation)
 David Reid (disambiguation)